Arenimonas halophila is a Gram-negative, aerobic, rod-shaped and non-motile bacterium from the genus of Arenimonas which has been isolated from soil.

References

Xanthomonadales
Bacteria described in 2018